Alasdair S. Roberts (born 1961) is a Canadian professor at the School of Public Policy, University of Massachusetts Amherst, and author of articles and books on public policy issues, especially relating to government secrecy and the exercise of government authority.

Education

Alasdair Roberts was born in New Liskeard, Ontario, Canada and grew up in Pembroke, Ontario, Canada, where he graduated from Fellowes High School.  He began his BA in politics at Queen's University in 1979. He received a JD from the University of Toronto Faculty of Law in 1984, a master's degree in public policy from the Kennedy School of Government at Harvard University in 1986, and a Ph.D. in public policy from Harvard University in 1994.

Political experience

Roberts was a vice-president of the Progressive Conservative Party of Ontario from 1982 to 1984, during the Big Blue Machine era.  He was a member of the executive for the youth wing of the party from 1980 to 1982.  Roberts was a Red Tory who supported policies such as universal public health insurance and strong human rights legislation.  He was an ex officio delegate to the federal Progressive Conservative leadership election of 1983 where he supported David Crombie.

Academic career

In 2017, Professor Roberts was appointed as a professor of political science and director of the School of Public Policy at the University of Massachusetts Amherst.  He completed his term as director of the School of Public Policy in 2022.

From 2015 to 2017, Roberts was a professor of public affairs in the Truman School of Public Affairs at the University of Missouri.  From 2008 to 2014, Roberts was the Jerome L. Rappaport Professor of Law and Public Policy at Suffolk University Law School. He was also Faculty Director of the Rappaport Center for Law and Public Service.  Before that, he was a professor of public administration in the Maxwell School of Citizenship and Public Affairs at Syracuse University, and also Director of the Campbell Public Affairs Institute at the Maxwell School.  Until 2001, he was an associate professor in the School of Policy Studies at Queen's University, and also served as associate director of the School from 1993 to 1995.

He is also a Fellow of the National Academy of Public Administration.  Previously he was a public member of the Administrative Conference of the United States, an Honorary Senior Research Fellow of the Constitution Unit, School of Public Policy, University College London, and co-editor of the journal Governance.

He received the Grace-Pépin Access to Information Award in 2014 for his research on open government.  In 2022 he received the Riggs Award for Lifetime Achievement in Comparative Administration from the American Society of Public Administration.

He has been cited in publications including The Boston Globe, The Christian Science Monitor, The San Diego Union-Tribune, The Times (London), Prospect, and the National Journal. His essays have appeared in numerous periodicals in the United Kingdom, Canada, the United States, and elsewhere, including The Guardian, Foreign Affairs, Foreign Policy, Government Executive, Prospect, The Globe and Mail (Toronto), Dnevnik, Saturday Night, and The Washington Post.

Books
 Superstates: Empires of the Twenty-First Century, Polity Books, 2022.
 Strategies for Governing: Reinventing Public Administration for a Dangerous Age, Cornell University Press, published in 2019, which received the 2021 book award from the Section on Public Administration Research of the American Society for Public Administration;
Can Government Do Anything Right? Polity Books, published in 2018;
 Four Crises of American Democracy: Representation, Mastery, Discipline, Anticipation,  Oxford University Press, published in 2017;
 The End of Protest: How Free Market Capitalism Learned to Control Dissent, published in 2013;
 America's First Great Depression: Economic Crisis and Political Disorder after the Panic of 1837, published in 2012;
 The Logic of Discipline: Global Capitalism and the Architecture of Government, published in 2010, which received an honorable mention from the book award committee of the Section on Public Administration Research of the American Society for Public Administration;
 The Collapse of Fortress Bush: The Crisis of Authority in American Government, published in 2008;
 Blacked Out: Government Secrecy in the Information Age, published in 2006, which received the 2006 Louis Brownlow Book Award from the National Academy of Public Administration, the 2007 book award from the Section on Public Administration Research of the American Society for Public Administration, the 2007 Best Book Award of the Academy of Management's Public and Nonprofit Division, and the 2007 Charles Levine Memorial Book Prize of the International Political Science Association's Research Committee on the Structure of Government.

References

External links
 Alasdair Roberts
 Rappaport Center
 "A conversation with Rappaport Chair Alasdair Roberts," Suffolk University Law School Alumni Magazine, Fall 2008

1961 births
Living people
Canadian academics
Canadian non-fiction writers
Canadian whistleblowers
Harvard Kennedy School alumni
People from Temiskaming Shores
Fellows of the United States National Academy of Public Administration
Suffolk University Law School faculty
Canadian political scientists
Canadian legal scholars
University of Missouri faculty
University of Toronto alumni
Queen's University at Kingston alumni
Academic staff of the Queen's University at Kingston
University of Massachusetts Amherst faculty